Woodgate is a hamlet in Oneida County, New York, United States. Woodgate has a post office with ZIP code 13494, which opened on December 19, 1878.

References

Hamlets in Oneida County, New York
Hamlets in New York (state)